The XIII Island Games were held in Åland, Finland, June 27-July 4, 2009. For the 13th edition of the Games, 25 teams competed in 14 different sports.

Participating Countries
24 islands competed in the 2009 Island Games. They were:

 
 
 
 
 
 
 
 
 
 
 
 
 
 
 
 
 
 
 
 
 
 
 
 
  Ynys Môn

Prince Edward Island were set to participate, but a lack of funding from their government caused their withdrawal from the event, and subsequent resignation from the International Island Games Association.

Medal table

Sports
The sports chosen for the games were:

References

External links
 Island Games 2009

 
Island Games
Island Games
Sport in Åland
Multi-sport events in Finland
2009 in Finnish sport
June 2009 sports events in Europe
July 2009 sports events in Europe